Ancistrosyrinx is a genus of sea snails, marine gastropod mollusks in the family Cochlespiridae.

Species
Species within the genus Ancistrosyrinx include:
 Ancistrosyrinx clytotropis (Sykes, 1906)
 † Ancistrosyrinx perspirata Koenen, 1865
 † Ancistrosyrinx spirata Rouault, 1850
 † Ancistrosyrinx subterebralis Reillardi, 1847
 † Ancistrosyrinx terebralis Lamarck, 1804
 † Ancistrosyrinx terebralis pulcherrima Edwards, 1861
Species brought into synonymy
 Ancistrosyrinx elegans Dall, 1881: synonym of Cochlespira elegans (Dall, 1881)
 Ancistrosyrinx kuroharai Kuroda, 1959 : synonym of Cochlespira kuroharai (Kuroda, 1959)
 Ancistrosyrinx orientis Melvill, 1904 : synonym of Thatcheriasyrinx orientis (Melvill, 1904)
 Ancistrosyrinx pulchella Schepman, 1913 : synonym of Cochlespira pulchella (Schepman, 1913)
 Ancistrosyrinx pulcherrissima Kira, 1955 : synonym of Cochlespira pulcherrissima (Kira, 1955)

References

 Maxime Glibert (1960) "Les Conadea fossiles du Cénozoïque étranger"; Koninklijk Belgisch Instituut voor Natuurwetenschappen; Verhandelingen, tweede reeks, deel 64